David Palffy is a Canadian film and television actor of Welsh and Hungarian descent, best known for playing Anubis and Sokar on Stargate SG-1.

Early life
David Palffy attended the Royal Academy of Dramatic Art in London, England.

Career
Palffy played the Goa'uld villains Sokar and Anubis in Stargate SG-1. He had recurring guest appearances in The X-Files, First Wave, Blade: The Series, and Andromeda. He played the role of Castillo Sermano in the film adaptation of the video game House of the Dead. He also played the main antagonist, Caleb Reece in the 2004 racing video game, Need for Speed: Underground 2.

Personal life
Palffy married actress Erica Durance in 2005. The couple's first child was born in February 2015. Their second son was born in December 2016. Palffy also has a son from a previous relationship.

References

External links

Canadian male film actors
Canadian male television actors
Canadian male voice actors
Living people
Year of birth missing (living people)
Place of birth missing (living people)